City of Dreams  is an Indian series by Nagesh Kukunoor which is available on Hotstar on its new label Hotstar Specials from 3 May 2019. It is directed by Nagesh Kukunoor  starring Atul Kulkarni, Priya Bapat, Sachin Pilgaonkar, Eijaz Khan, Siddharth Chandekar and Adinath Kothare. Music is composed my Tapas Relia.

It received mixed reviews with praise for Kulkarni's performance and criticism for writing and direction.

Conception 
The idea for the show came from Kukunoor's team member, Rohit Banawlikar. Banawlikar and Kukunoor co-wrote an anthology, intended to be turned into a feature film. But as digital platforms grew in India, Kukunoor felt that there was a scope for a series.

Plot 
Multiple lives intersect after an assassination attempt on Mumbai's most polarising political figure. A single stone thrown in a seemingly placid lake sets off a series of ripples that affect everyone and hurt many. City of Dreams is the story of the feud within the Gaikwad family, which erupts after an assassination attempt on a polarizing political figure. Blurring the lines between moral and immoral, in a struggle for power forms the core of this transfixing narrative.

Cast 
 Priya Bapat as Poornima Gaikwad
 Siddharth Chandekar as Ashish Rao Gaikwad (Season 1)
 Eijaz Khan as SI Wasim Khan
 Atul Kulkarni as Amey Rao Gaikwad 'Saheb'
 Sushant Singh as Jagan Hejmadi 'Anna' (Season 2)
 Devas Dixit as Raja
 Vishwas Kini as Goutam (Season 1)
 Sandeep Kulkarni as Purushottam
Rakesh Dubey as Inspector Siddhesh Laad (season 2)
 Uday Tikekar as Jiten Kaka (Season 1)
 Amrita Bagchi as Katrina (Season 1)
 Sachin Pilgaonkar as CM Jagdish Gurav
Shishir Sharma as Ramnik Bhai
 Flora Saini as Mystery Women, Asha
Ivan Rodrigues as Nambiar (Season 2)
 Geetika Tyagi as Shireen Ali 
 Rio Kapadia as Commissioner Roy
Saurabh Goyal as Koushik Amre
Pavleen Gujral as Lipakshi (Season 1)
Lekha Prajapati as Lipakshi (Season 2 - replaced)
Adinath Kothare as Mahesh Arawle
Divya Seth as Vibha
Ankur Rathee as Arvind Mehta
Vibhawari Deshpande as Manjari
Gauransh Chauhan as Rashid
Atisha Naik as Asiya
Sajjad Khan as Bhairav Pal
Shriyam Bhagnani as Tanya Mehta
Sunit Razdan as Dabolkar

Episodes Season 1

Episodes Season 2

Promotion 
On 21 April 2019, Hotstar Specials released the teaser for City of Dreams on YouTube and other social media platforms announcing the release of the series on 3 May 2019. The show will consist of 10 episodes.

Reception 
Upon release, Gautaman Bhaskaran of News18 rated the show a 2 out of 5 and said "Kukunoor gives away too many clues, and viewers can easily guess how the series will pan out".

Udita Jhunjhunwala of Firstpost rated it two stars and was of the opinion that the show was longer than necessary and the show missed a tight script and several scenes were dispensable.

Soumya Rao from Scroll.in reviewed that "the protagonists were iterations of characters that have been seen often on the screen".

Ektaa Malik from The Indian Express critically reviewed the show and stated "With Nagesh Kukunoor as director, the expectations were high from City of Dreams. Even the repeated, but not-needed, ‘strong language, violence, nudity and sex’ — used as labels for the show — do nothing to salvage it."

References

External links 
 

Hindi-language Disney+ Hotstar original programming
2019 Indian television series debuts
Indian drama television series
Hindi-language television shows
Television shows set in Mumbai
Indian political television series